Mummy, also known as Mummy - Save Me, is a 2016 Indian Kannada language supernatural horror film starring Priyanka Upendra, written and directed by Lohith H. The film is produced by K Ravikumar under KRK Productions and distributed by Horizon Studio. The film was dubbed in Telugu, Hindi, and Tamil as Chinnari, Mummy, and Mummy - Save Me , respectively.

Plot
Priya (Priyanka Upendra), a seven-month pregnant widow, and her six-year-old daughter Kriya (Yuvina Parthavi) move from Bangalore to Goa after the death of her husband (Kriya's father). They move to a large villa, but the family start to experience strange things shortly after the move. Kriya is badly affected by her father's death. He bought her a doll as gift for her before dying. Kriya starts to speak with the doll and considers it as her friend. Priya is upset and sad due to her husband's death, and due to her loss, she is unable to spend time with Kriya. Kriya starts to become stubborn and gets sad as her mother is not spending quality time with her. Kriya sees a ghost for the first time and gets scared. After crying and shouting, Kriya eventually befriends the ghost, and is seen speaking to it. Seeing Kriya speaking alone and due to her behavior, Priya becomes tense and concerned, and consults a doctor. The doctor suggests Priya to spend time with Kriya. Priya and Kriya together spend time, they go out and enjoy each other's company. Priya experiences the same as Kriya, she sees the ghost. One day the doctor, whom Priya consulted, calls her and informs that her daughter Kriya is speaking with someone in really whom no one except Kriya can see, the doctor sends a priest to Priya's villa. The same day Priya gets hurt and even Kriya gets hurt. Their relatives get them to hospital where the Priest comes to meet Priya and tells them the story behind the ghost.

The ghost's name is Kumari who was an orphan who had married a rich man and was happy with him. Even after eight years of marriage, Kumari was not blessed with a baby, so her in-laws and elders decided and arranged her husband to marry another woman. Kumari was really upset by this news of divorce, but soon she got pregnant. When she was seven-months pregnant with their first child, she and her husband decides to visit a temple while coming back they meet with an accident and they both die. Kumari always wanted a child and her wish was incomplete so she became an evil spirit and has since roamed around the road where her demise had happened. Knowing about Kumari's wicked nature, a woman from Kerala captures Kumari and ties her in the forest. After 48 years, a young boy gets possessed by Kumari and he starts to behave like her. The boy's mother calls a pandit who captures the ghost but it was unsuccessful, because the pandit died and the spirit of Kumari enters the doll which is now in Kriya's possession.

Kumari forcefully takes Kriya to the villa from hospital. Priya and others also go into the villa, where everyone gets ambushed by the vengeful spirit of Kumari. Kumari starts to drag Kriya to take her with her to the afterlife as the child she wished to have, and Priya doesn't allow her to do so. Priya begs her to leave her child and even Kriya says that she wants to stay with her mother and doesn't like Kumari. Hearing this, Kumari leaves Kriya's hand, and her spirit gets into ash.

Six months later, Kriya leaves for school and bids farewell to her mother. While leaving the house, Kriya is playing with Kumari again.

Cast
 Priyanka Upendra as Priya
 Yuvina Parthavi as Kriya
 Madhusudan as Father Mosis
 Aishwarya Shindogi as Sneha
 Vatsala Mohan as Vatsala
 Sandeep as John
 Sidlingu Sridhar as James

Production
The trailer of Mummy was launched on 30 June 2016 at ETA Mall, Bengaluru, the grand event was graced by her husband Realstar Upendra and actress Tara.

References

External links 
 
 

2016 horror films
2016 films
2010s supernatural horror films
2010s Kannada-language films
Indian supernatural horror films